Sam Speakman (born 9 August 1884) was an English footballer who played as a defender for Liverpool in The Football League. Speakman started his career at Colne FC before he joined Liverpool. He played primarily as a full back and made 14 appearances for the club before the outbreak of World War I. He made 7 appearances during the war in a season that was completed, before football stopped. Following the resumption of football for the 1919–20 season he was unable to stake a regular place in the team and only made 4 appearances.

References

1884 births
English footballers
Hamilton Academical F.C. players
Liverpool F.C. players
Motherwell F.C. players
English Football League players
Year of death missing
Association football fullbacks